Gazzetta Chimica Italiana was an Italian peer-reviewed scientific journal in chemistry. It was established in 1871 by the Italian Chemical Society (Società Chimica Italiana), but in 1998 publication ceased and it was merged with some other European chemistry-related journals, to form the European Journal of Organic Chemistry and the European Journal of Inorganic Chemistry.

See also 

 Anales de Química
 Chemische Berichte
 Bulletin des Sociétés Chimiques Belges
 Bulletin de la Société Chimique de France
 European Journal of Organic Chemistry
 Liebigs Annalen
 Recueil des Travaux Chimiques des Pays-Bas
 Chimika Chronika
 Revista Portuguesa de Química
 ACH—Models in Chemistry

External links 
 Italian Chemical Society

Academic journals published by learned and professional societies
Chemical industry in Italy
Chemistry journals
Defunct journals
1871 establishments in Italy
Multilingual journals
Publications established in 1871
Publications disestablished in 1997
1997 disestablishments in Italy